Pagodar (also Romanized as Pāgodār and Pā-ye Godār; also known as Pāgodār-e Maskūn) is a village in Amjaz Rural District, in the Central District of Anbarabad County, Kerman Province, Iran. At the 2006 census, its population was 25, in 4 families.

References 

Populated places in Anbarabad County